Jerry Joseph Fotheringill (born March 7, 1942 in Tacoma, Washington) is an American former pair skater. With sister Judianne Fotheringill, he was the U.S. national champion in 1963 and 1964. They represented the United States at the 1964 Winter Olympics where they placed 7th.

The Fotheringills were originally from Tacoma, Washington but later relocated to train in Colorado Springs, Colorado, where they represented the Broadmoor Skating Club. Jerry attended Colorado College, where he majored in psychology and political science, during the time he was competing.

Competitive highlights
(with Judianne Fotheringill)

References

 
  

American male pair skaters
Olympic figure skaters of the United States
Figure skaters at the 1964 Winter Olympics
1942 births
Living people
Sportspeople from Tacoma, Washington
20th-century American people
21st-century American people